Victor Linley was a member of the Wisconsin State Senate.

Biography
Linley was born on September 5, 1865 in Atchison, Kansas. He was a lawyer by trade. Linley died on November 19, 1915.

Political career
Linley was a member of the Senate during the 1911 and 1913 sessions. Previously, he was Mayor of Superior, Wisconsin from 1906 to 1908. He was a Republican.

References

External links

The Political Graveyard

People from Atchison, Kansas
Politicians from Superior, Wisconsin
Republican Party Wisconsin state senators
Mayors of places in Wisconsin
Wisconsin lawyers
Columbia Law School alumni
1865 births
1915 deaths
Burials in Wisconsin
19th-century American politicians
19th-century American lawyers